No. 611 (West Lancashire) Squadron is a British Royal Air Force squadron. It was first formed in 1936 and was disbanded in 1957 after seeing combat as a fighter unit during the Second World War. It was reformed as a reserve squadron in 2013.

History

Early years
The squadron was formed at RAF Hendon, Middlesex on 10 February 1936 as a day bomber unit. The squadron set up its permanent base at RAF Speke (now Liverpool John Lennon Airport) on 6 May and began recruiting personnel from Liverpool and the surrounding area. Its first Hawker Hart light bombers arrived in June, being replaced by Hawker Hinds from April 1938.

Wartime operations

On 1 January 1939, the unit became a fighter squadron, receiving its first Supermarine Spitfire Mk.I's in May. The squadron left for RAF Duxford on 13 August, as part of the Fighter Command's No. 12 Group, After a period of defensive duties on the east coast, No. 611 became fully operational from its RAF Digby base in Lincolnshire in May 1940, firstly over Dunkirk and then taking part in the Battle of Britain campaign with the Duxford Wing, 12 Group's 'Big Wing' formation.
The squadron commenced offensive sweeps over occupied northern France in January 1941, based at RAF Hornchurch, moving to RAF Drem in Scotland for recuperation in November 1941. The unit moved south again in June 1942 to RAF Kenley for deployment on shipping reconnaissance, escort and defensive missions. For Operation Overlord (the Allied invasion of Normandy) it was equipped with the Spitfire V LF as part of Air Defence of Great Britain, though under the operational control of RAF Second Tactical Air Force. No. 611 provided covering patrols for the invasion from its base at RAF Deanland. The squadron then moved to south-west England for a short period.

Long-range escort missions began to be flown from RAF Bradwell Bay, Essex, from late August 1944, until No. 611 moved to RAF Skeabrae in Orkney on 3 October. After converting to Merlin powered North American Mustang Mk.IV's the squadron again moved south, this time to RAF Hawkinge in Kent and resumed escort duties for the rest of the war. The squadron disbanded as an RAF squadron on 15 August 1945 at RAF Peterhead.

Postwar operations

The squadron reformed again at Liverpool's Speke airport on 10 May 1946 as a fighter squadron within the Royal Auxiliary Air Force. Because of growing airliner movements at Speke, the unit moved to RAF Woodvale near Southport on 22 July 1946 equipped with Spitfire F.14's and from June 1948 with the higher performance Spitfire F.22. Gloster Meteor F.4 jet fighters were received in May 1951, these requiring a move to the longer runways at RAF Hooton Park on the Wirral on 9 July. Re-equipment with updated Meteor F.8's came in December 1951 and these were flown from Hooton Park until the squadron disbanded on 10 March 1957, together with all other RAuxAF flying units.

611 Squadron was reformed at RAF Woodvale during 2013 in line with the expansion of the Royal Auxiliary Air Force recommended by the Future Reserves 2020 (FR20) Commission and endorsed by the Air Force Board Standing Committee. The commission was set up by the Prime Minister in 2010 to examine the shape and role of the Reserve Forces as part of the Strategic Defence and Security Review. The role of the squadron is to provide trained personnel to other RAF units.

Notable Pilots

 Eric Lock. July – November 1941 Top scoring British born pilot during the Battle of Britain and 26 confirmed victories during just six months of flying time.
 Barrie Heath. Heath shot down four German aircraft between 1940 and 1941. After the war he went on to become the chairman of the engineering giant GKN.
 Roland "Bee" Beamont. Famous test pilot.

Aircraft operated

Squadron bases

Commanding officers

See also
 List of Royal Air Force aircraft squadrons
 List of Royal Air Force stations
 List of former Royal Air Force stations

References

Citations

Bibliography

 Brown, Squadron Leader Peter, AFC. Honour Restored: The Battle of Britain, Dowding and the Fight for Freedom. Spellmount, 2005.
 

 

 The Illustrated Encyclopedia of Aircraft, (Part Work 1982–1985), Orbis Publishing, pp 4238/9

External links

 611 RAUxAF
 The Official 611 Squadron website
 Article about Norwegian Arne Austeen, former 611 pilot

Fighter squadrons of the Royal Air Force in World War II
611
RAF squadrons involved in the Battle of Britain
Military units and formations established in 1936